Perigonia lusca, the half-blind sphinx or coffee sphinx, is a moth of the family Sphingidae. It was first described by Johan Christian Fabricius in 1777.

Distribution 
It is found from the northern tip of South America, through most of Central America, and up to Florida in the United States.

Description 
The wingspan is 55–65 mm.

Biology 
There are several generations per year in southern Florida. On the Galápagos Islands, adults are on wing in April and July. In the tropics, adults are probably on wing year round.

The larvae have been recorded feeding on Guettarda macrosperma, Guettarda scabra, Coffea species (including Coffea arabica), Ilex krugiana, Ilex paraguariensis, Genipa americana, Rondeletia, Gonzalagunia species (including Gonzalagunia spicata) and Cinchona succirubra. They are green with a yellow tail horn and a dark blue stripe down the back. There is at least one color morph.

Subspecies and formes 
Perigonia lusca lusca (Mexico to Panama and Honduras, Venezuela, Paraguay, Argentina, Brazil, Bolivia, Bahamas, Cuba, Puerto Rico, St. Vincent, southern United States)
Perigonia lusca continua Vázquez-G., 1959 (Revillagigedo Island and Soccoro Island in Mexico)
 Perigonia lusca f. interrupta Walker, 1875

References

External links

Perigonia
Moths described in 1777